Wire Train is the fourth album by the American band Wire Train, released in 1990. David Fincher directed the video for "Should She Cry?" Wire Train supported the album by touring with Bob Dylan.

Production
The album, which was delayed due to issues with Wire Train's former label, 415 Records, was produced by Don Smith and David Trickle. It was recorded live in the studio, in Los Angeles. The lyrics were written by Kevin Hunter. Benmont Tench, Susannah Melvoin, and Mike Campbell contributed to Wire Train.

Critical reception

Trouser Press noted that "the record's most striking song ('Should She Cry?', a catchy breath of pop air) owes no stylistic debt outside the band's own past." Entertainment Weekly determined that "a self-conscious dose of Dylanesque revelry is amusing in its way, but Wire Train‘s adventures into gospelly rock (in a Van Morrison-Stones vein) are less compelling." The San Diego Union-Tribune concluded that "the band members sound less like dedicated rockers and more like adroit studio musicians moving easily from one genre to another with a minimum of fuss or inspiration."

The New York Times stated that the songs "are immaculately crafted with ringing guitars, subtle drumming and airy, open spaces that lend a feeling of freedom and timelessness." The Calgary Herald deemed the band "mimics," writing that "when you're short of ideas, might just as well borrow from the best." Rolling Stone praised Wire Train's "knack for passionate, intelligent rock 'n' roll."

AllMusic wrote that "there are still a couple missteps, foremost among them being the absolutely atrocious 'Oh Me Oh My', the worst Bob Dylan parody since Simon & Garfunkel's 'A Simple Desultory Philippic' (or Knocked Out Loaded)."

Track listing

References

Wire Train albums
1990 albums
MCA Records albums